The 2022–23 Gardner–Webb Runnin' Bulldogs men's basketball team represented Gardner–Webb University in the 2022–23 NCAA Division I men's basketball season. The Runnin' Bulldogs, led by tenth-year head coach Tim Craft, played their home games at Paul Porter Arena in Boiling Springs, North Carolina as members of the Big South Conference.

Previous season
The Runnin' Bulldogs finished the 2021–22 season 18–13, 11–5 in Big South play to finish in second place in the South Division. As the No. 3 seed, they defeated Campbell in the quarterfinals of the Big South tournament, before falling to Winthrop in the semifinals.

Roster

Schedule and results

|-
!colspan=12 style=| Exhibition

|-
!colspan=12 style=| Non-conference regular season

|-
!colspan=12 style=| Big South regular season

|-
!colspan=12 style=| Big South tournament
|-

|-

Sources

See also
 2022–23 Gardner–Webb Runnin' Bulldogs women's basketball team

References

Gardner–Webb Runnin' Bulldogs men's basketball seasons
Gardner-Webb Runnin' Bulldogs
Gardner-Webb Runnin' Bulldogs men's basketball
Gardner-Webb Runnin' Bulldogs men's basketball